Karl (Kalle) Del'Haye (born 18 August 1955) is a German former footballer who played as a winger.

Club career 
He is best remembered as a Borussia Mönchengladbach player, but also played for Alemannia Aachen, Bayern Munich and Fortuna Düsseldorf in the West German top-flight.

International career 
Del'Haye was capped twice by West Germany, and was part of the winning squad at Euro 1980.

Honours

Club
Borussia Mönchengladbach
Bundesliga: 1974–75, 1975–76, 1976–77
UEFA Cup: 1974–75, 1978–79; Runner-up 1979–80
European Cup: Runner-up 1976–77

Bayern Munich
Bundesliga: 1980–81, 1984–85
DFB-Pokal: 1981–82, 1983–84; Runner-up 1984–85
European Cup: Runner-up 1981–82

Fortuna Düsseldorf
Intertoto Cup: 1986

International
West Germany
European Championship: 1980

References

External links
 
 
 

1955 births
Living people
German footballers
Germany international footballers
Germany B international footballers
Germany youth international footballers
Association football wingers
Alemannia Aachen players
Borussia Mönchengladbach players
FC Bayern Munich footballers
Fortuna Düsseldorf players
Bundesliga players
UEFA Euro 1980 players
UEFA European Championship-winning players
Sportspeople from Aachen
UEFA Cup winning players
Footballers from North Rhine-Westphalia
West German footballers